Below is an episode list for both the British TV series Saturday Live which were essentially the same production. The series aired on Channel 4 between 1985 and 1988. This was a variety show transmitted live, primarily with a mix of comedy and music. Shows were later edited into compilation shows which aired a few months after the end of each series, and retitled Best of Saturday Live, Saturday Almost Live and Friday Night Almost Live.

The show format and name were copied in subsequent decades in 1996 and 2007. These series are not included here.

Overview

Live show

Compilation show

Episodes

Full episodes of the live shows have never subsequently been aired since their original showing, nor have they been made commercially available. Instead, individual performances have been re-edited into compilation shows aired by Channel 4 in the same year, or for DVD compilations released between 2007 and 2009.

 Where known, the lists below are annotated to indicate if a performance later appeared in a compilation show (Best Of Saturday Live, Saturday Almost Live, or Friday Night Almost Live) for that series. e.g. (Almost:1)
 The lists are also annotated to indicate if a performance appears on a DVD compilation
 SL1 = Saturday Live - The Best Of Series 1
 SL2 = Saturday Live - The Best Of Series 2
 FNL = The Very Best Of Friday Night Live
 FLEE = Saturday Live - Fry And Laurie, Harry Enfield And Ben Elton
 DB = The Dangerous Brothers - Dangervision

All performers and performances are listed in their original running order for each show. Where the performance details are incomplete, the details are highlighted.

Saturday Live (Pilot)

Saturday Live - Series 1

Saturday Live - Series 2

Friday Night Live - Series 1

References

External links 
 
 
 
 
 TV Pop Diaries Article
 VHistory Blog detailing recordings of specific Saturday Night Live shows
 VHistory Blog detailing recordings of specific Friday Night Live shows

Saturday Live